Hedychrum is a large genus of cuckoo wasps (the family Chrysididae). With roughly 150 species, it is the second largest genus in the family; most species are from the Palaearctic, but they can be found in the Oriental, Afrotropical, Nearctic, and Neotropical regions. Their hosts are typically from the subfamily Philanthinae.

Selected European species
 Hedychrum aureicolle Mocsary, 1889
 Hedychrum chalybaeum Dahlbom, 1854
 Hedychrum gerstaeckeri Chevrier, 1869
 Hedychrum longicolle Abeille de Perrin, 1877
 Hedychrum luculentum Förster, 1853
 Hedychrum mavromoustakisi Trautmann, 1929
 Hedychrum micans Lucas, 1849
 Hedychrum niemelai Linsenmaier, 1959
 Hedychrum nobile Scopoli, 1763
 Hedychrum rufipes  R. du Buysson, 1893
 Hedychrum rutilans Dahlbom, 1854 (syn. Hedychrum intermedium)
 Hedychrum tobiasi Kilimnik, 1993
 Hedychrum virens Dahlbom, 1854
 Hedychrum viridilineolatum Kilimnik, 1993

Gallery

References

 Biolib

Hymenoptera genera
Hymenoptera of Europe
Chrysidinae